Cletus Erik Thule Andersson (4 March 1893 – 12 July 1971) was a Swedish water polo player. Together with his elder brother Vilhelm he was part of the Swedish team that finished fourth at the 1924 Summer Olympics. Cletus played all six matches and scored four goals.

References

1893 births
1971 deaths
Olympic water polo players of Sweden
Swedish male water polo players
Water polo players at the 1924 Summer Olympics
SK Neptun water polo players
Sportspeople from Stockholm